Khat Parast (also Romanized as Khaţ Parast and Khaţţ Parast) is a village in Khvoresh Rostam-e Shomali Rural District, Khvoresh Rostam District, Khalkhal County, Ardabil Province, Iran. At the 2006 census, its population was 55, in 11 families.

References 

Tageo

Towns and villages in Khalkhal County